B.M. Lal was the Chief Justice of Patna High Court. He was also the acting Governor of Bihar.

References

Governors of Bihar
Indian judges
Chief Justices of the Patna High Court
Living people
Year of birth missing (living people)